Henri Pavillard (15 August 1905 – 29 January 1978) was a French international football player. He is mostly known for his international career and his club stint at Stade Français. After playing for Stade Français, Pavillard spent his declining years playing in French Algeria with AS Saint-Eugène. He made his international debut on 29 April 1928 in a 1–1 draw with Portugal. Pavillard was a member of the team that participated in the football tournament at the 1928 Summer Olympics. He captained the national team four times and scored his only goal in his final appearance with the team; a 5–2 defeat to Belgium.

References

External links 
 
 

1905 births
1978 deaths
French footballers
France international footballers
Association football midfielders
Olympic footballers of France
Footballers at the 1928 Summer Olympics